Signe Horn Fuglesang (born 1938) is a Norwegian art historian and Professor Emerita at the University of Oslo, best known for her published research and writings on Viking art.

She is a fellow of the Norwegian Academy of Science and Letters.

Bibliography
Fuglesang, S.H. (1980). Some Aspects of the Ringerike Style: A Phase of 11th Century Scandinavian Art, [Mediaeval Scandinavia Supplements], University Press of Southern Denmark: Odense, 1980. 
Fuglesang, S.H. (2013). "Copying and Creativity in Early Viking Ornament", in Reynolds, A. and Webster, L. (eds) (2013), Early Medieval Art and Archaeology in the Northern World—Studies in Honour of James Graham-Campbell, Brill: Leiden and Boston, 2013. , pp. 825–841.

References

Faculty Page - University of Oslo

1938 births
Living people
Norwegian art historians
Academic staff of the University of Oslo
Members of the Norwegian Academy of Science and Letters